Jean Alaux, called "le Romain" ("the Roman"), (1786 – 2 March 1864) was a French history painter and Director of the French Academy in Rome from 1846 to 1852.

Biography

Alaux was born in Bordeaux, the son of a painter and the second of four brothers who all became painters. He received his first lessons in art from his father, but went on to a formal training with Pierre Lacour and later with Pierre-Narcisse Guérin. In 1807 he was admitted to the École des Beaux-Arts in Paris. From 1808 he entered works for the Prix de Rome, but his energies were diverted when his elder brother, Jean-Francois Alaux (1783–1858), asked him to help with a large "neorama" (a type of Panorama) he was working on. Alaux eventually won the major Prix de Rome in 1815 with a work entitled Briseis weeping over the body of Patroclus, a scene inspired by the Iliad of Homer. He subsequently became a pensionnaire at the French Academy in Rome from 1816 to 1820 and went on to become its director.

Among his fellow artists at the Academy were Drolling, Picot, and Cogniet, along with sculptors David d'Angers, Pradier, and Ramey; he became a friend of Ingres.  His first painting at the Academy was Cadmus killing the dragon at the fountains of Dirce, which was later purchased by the Duke of Orleans but was destroyed in the fire which engulfed the Palais-Royal in the French Revolution of 1848. Alaux also painted at the Academy Diamedes carrying off the palladium and Episodes in the combats between the centaurs and the Lapithes. In 1821, he returned to France, where his reputation steadily grew with works such as The Baptism of Clovis (1825), States General of 1838, The Assembly of the notables at Rouen in 1596, and States General 1614. Under the July Monarchy, he worked at the "Galerie des batailles" of the Château de Versailles, for which he painted The Battle of Villaviciosa (1836); The Capture of Valenciennes (1837); and The Battle of Denain (1839).

Alaux was appointed as director of the French Academy in Rome in 1846 and was caught up in the siege of Rome of 1849, involving defending Italian forces under Garibaldi and the invading French army; he and his students were forced to temporarily flee the city for France. His directorship ended quietly with his retirement in 1852.

Alaux died in Paris on 2 March 1864.

References

External links

Paintings by Alaux (Insecula)
Portrait of Jean Alaux by Ingres (Christie's)
The atelier of Ingres in Rome (Christie's)

1786 births
1864 deaths
19th-century French painters
French male painters
Prix de Rome for painting
Artists from Bordeaux
Academic art
Members of the Académie des beaux-arts
19th-century painters of historical subjects
19th-century French male artists